Cris Welch is a former American football coach.  He served as the head coach at Graceland University in Lamoni, Iowa from 2003 to 2009, aiding a turnaround that resulted in the 2005 squad reaching the NAIA playoffs after finishing 0–10 just three years prior.

Head coaching record

References

Year of birth missing (living people)
Living people
Graceland Yellowjackets football coaches